Sir Maurice Charles Philip O'Connell KCH  (1768 – 25 May 1848) was a commander of forces and lieutenant-governor of colonial New South Wales.

Early life
Maurice Charles O'Connell was born in Ireland in 1768. He had had a distinguished career in the army.  His family the Tarmon branch of the O’Connell clan of Kerry, Munster were cousins to the Derrynane O’Connell family, such as Daniel O’Connell MP.

New South Wales
In 1809, he came with the newly appointed Governor of New South Wales Macquarie to Sydney in charge of the 73rd Regiment of Foot. There, in May 1810, O'Connell hastily married widow Mary Putland, the daughter of the deposed former governor William Bligh, shortly before Bligh's return to England.

O'Connell also had a commission as Lieutenant-Governor, and so acted when Macquarie was absent in Tasmania in the latter part of 1812. O'Connell was then on good terms with Macquarie, who, in November of that year, strongly recommended that his salary should be considerably increased.

Although William Bligh had departed, his daughter, now Mary O'Connell, had not forgiven those who had deposed her father, creating tensions between her husband and others in the colony. O'Connell became involved in the quarrel and in August 1813 Macquarie in a dispatch to Lord Bathurst stated that, "though lieutenant-colonel O'Connell is naturally a very well disposed man . . . it would greatly improve the harmony of the country . . . if the whole of the officers and men of the 73 regiment were removed from it".

On 26 March 1814 O'Connell and his regiment were transferred to Ceylon. He attained the rank of major-general in 1830 and was knighted in 1835.

Return to New South Wales
In 1838, Maurice O'Connell returned to Sydney in command of the forces and was appointed a member of the New South Wales Legislative Council. He was senior member of the executive council when, the question of the rights of Bligh's daughters to certain land granted to Bligh in 1806 having been again raised, Governor Gipps found himself in an extremely delicate position. The matter was settled by compromise in 1841.

O'Connell was acting-governor of New South Wales from 12 July to 2 August 1846.

Later life
Maurice O'Connell died in Sydney on 25 May 1848, and received a full military funeral at St James' Church.

Legacy

O'Connell, New South Wales was named after him by George Evans, when Evans followed the route of Blaxland, Lawson, and Wentworth in crossing the Blue Mountains as were streets in Sydney, Melbourne and North Adelaide.

His son, Sir Maurice Charles O'Connell, was also a member of the Legislative Council (1845-1849) and then a member of the Queensland Legislative Council (1860-1879).

External links
 OConnell, Maurice at the Dictionary of Sydney.

References

 

|-

1768 births
1848 deaths
Lieutenant-Governors of New South Wales
Members of the New South Wales Legislative Council
Maurice
Irish emigrants to colonial Australia